Guiterman is a surname. People with the surname include:

 Arthur Guiterman (1871–1943), American writer known for his humorous poems
 Rosine Guiterman (1886–1960), Australian activist, teacher, poet and humanitarian